Gulliford Farm is a Grade-II listed farmhouse in East Devon, between Exmouth and Topsham. It is situated in the village of Exton, in the parish of Woodbury. The main residential building dates to the 16th century with later Georgian and Victorian additions.

History 
The first mention of Gulliford Farm comes as a small dwelling in one of many small hamlets which sprung up in the area around 1300, its name deriving from Geldforde or Geldfeld, a reference to the harvests from the lands surrounding the waterways of East Devon.

The buildings which then existed were part of the Nutwell Estate, owned by the Dynham (1311–1501) and Prideaux (1520–1649) families, respectively. Through them the farm was rented and used by tenant farmers, with the largest farm remaining as Nutwell Castle itself.

In 1575, after centuries on inadequate maintenance, the 14th century buildings were torn down, and a new, large home farm and hunting lodge was built by Sir Francis Drake, 2nd Bart. It is through the second Baronet that the Drake family, mainly Sir Francis Henry Drake, 5th Baronet, would eventually possess Gulliford.

In 1649, Amias Prideaux sold Gulliford, as a part of the lands of Nutwell Castle, to Sir Henry Ford, whose trustees once again sold the estate following his death. At this point Sir Henry Pollexfen bought the estate, and Gulliford soon after entered the ownership of the Drake family. Toward the end of the 18th century, Gulliford passed to Francis Augustus Eliott, 2nd Baron Heathfield, who was the son of the governor of Gibraltar during the American Revolutionary Wars, George Augustus Elliot, 1st Baron Heathfield.

It was the 2nd Baron Heathfield that from 1780 to 1799 destroyed all but the chapel of the original Nutwell, and rebuilt the house, whilst briefly living at Gulliford. It was at this time that the baron extended Gulliford to include the extensive brick barns and rooms in the two courtyards. These were designed to hold 'up to 30- horses for plough-sharing' and accommodation for staff and visitors. The farmhouse is a Grade II listed building.

In 1979, June Hallett – the wife of the then-owner of the farm, uncovered plaster of paris frescoes on the inner walls of a fireplace in the house. The images were consequentially restored, and are believed to be the earliest known depictions of Californian Poppies. The frescoes are estimated to have been made between 1580 and 1585, immediately following Sir Francis Drake's return from his circumnavigation of the globe.

References

Farms in Devon
Grade II listed agricultural buildings
Grade II listed buildings in Devon
Woodbury, East Devon